The Massacre of El Ouffia took place on 6 April 1832 during the French conquest of Algeria. It was a war crime committed against the tribe of El Ouffia near El Harrach by the Troupes Coloniales under Colonel Maximilien Joseph Schauenburg.

Historical Context

In December 1831, Duc de Rovigo arrived in Algiers to establish the French colonial power in Mitidja. His arrival coincided with the reconfiguration of the regiments of Troupes Coloniales involved in the offensive against the Algerian resistance fighters scattered all around the Casbah of Algiers.

Through the ordinance of 17th November, 1831, the Chasseurs d'Afrique were created to establish the presence of cavalry capable of rapid incursions into the heart of rebel areas in French North Africa. Four squadrons were formed and these regiments of horsemen immediately began targeting the insurrectionary tribes around Algiers.

The members of le 1er régiment de chasseurs d'Afrique proved to be disciplined and reliable and were placed under the command of Colonel Maximilien Joseph Schauenburg in order to guarantee the pacification of the suburbs of Algiers.

Raid on El Ouffia

Colonel Schauenburg's cavalry regiment began its raids against the tribes around Algiers (Fahs) in a bloodthirsty and macabre way in the sad attack of the tribe of El Ouffia near the course of Oued El Harrach, which had taken place on 6 April 1832, just five months after the formation of this new regiment.

While this regiment was being equipped with arms and supplies, Colonel Schauenbourg received from Governor Savary the sudden order to leave the Algiers encampment at night towards the bank of Oued El Harrach in a first mission against the Algerians.

The horsemen then began a nocturnal and silent march, which was an ordinary prelude to the raid and carnage which was being prepared against the civilians of the tribe of El Ouffia.

This column of horsemen was led by General Faudoas, who was an officer of the First French Empire like his colleague Colonel Schauenbourg, and this punitive expedition was intended to punish the tribe of El Ouffia and other neighboring allied tribes who were considered dangerous against the French colonial presence in Algiers.

Massacre
General Marquis de Faudoas arrived with Colonel Schauenburg and their horsemen on the night of 6 April 1832 at the village of El Ouffia while the members of the tribe were asleep in their tents.

Due to the strict instructions of the general-in-chief, the Duc de Rovigo, this expeditionary body of troops from Algiers were tasked with slaughtering the civilians of El Ouffia without sparing a single one of them, including women, children and the elderly.

The sleeping Algerians were surprised at dawn on 7 April 1837, and all were slain without attempting to defend themselves.

No one managed to escape the massacre. The horsemen of General Faudoas followed orders to make no distinction regarding the age or sex of their Algerian victims.

Upon return from this expedition, the riders of Schauenburg's regiment carried the heads of their victims at the ends of their spears into the city of Algiers.

Gallery

See also
 French conquest of Algeria
 List of French governors of Algeria
 First French Empire
 Anne Jean Marie René Savary
 Marquis de Faudoas
 Maximilien Joseph Schauenburg
 Chasseurs d'Afrique
 Origins of the French Foreign Legion
 Oued El Harrach
 El Harrach
 El Harrach District
 Algiers Province
 Mitidja

External links

Bibliography

French conquest videos

References

Conflicts in 1832
1832 in Algeria
Massacres in 1832
Battles involving Algeria
Battles involving France
Massacres in Algeria
May 1832 events
French Algeria
Invasions by France